Glen Young (born May 2, 1969) is a Canadian gridiron football coach and former linebacker.  He is currently the defensive coordinator for the Toronto Argonauts of the Canadian Football League (CFL).  He played professionally as a linebacker for eight seasons in the (CFL) for the Argonauts, Montreal Alouettes, and Edmonton Eskimos, from 1998 to 2005. Prior to his time in the CFL, he played two seasons in the National Football League (NFL) for the San Diego Chargers, from 1995 to 1996. 

On February 6, 2020, it was announced that Young had joined the Toronto Argonauts as the team's defensive coordinator. After the 2020 CFL season was cancelled, he coached through part of the 2021 Toronto Argonauts season, but was not retained for 2022.

References

External links
 Winnipeg profile

1969 births
Living people
American football linebackers
Canadian football linebackers
Canadian players of American football
Brockport Golden Eagles football coaches
Edmonton Elks players
Hampden–Sydney Tigers football coaches
Michigan State Spartans football coaches
Montreal Alouettes players
Players of Canadian football from Ontario
San Diego Chargers players
Syracuse Orange football players
Toronto Argonauts coaches
Toronto Argonauts players
Winnipeg Blue Bombers coaches
High school football coaches in Pennsylvania
Sportspeople from Scarborough, Toronto
Canadian football people from Toronto